Antonio Lucifero (died 1521) was a Roman Catholic prelate who served as Bishop of Crotone (1508–1521).

Biography
On 15 March 1508, Antonio Lucifero was appointed during the papacy of Pope Julius II as Bishop of Crotone.
He served as Bishop of Crotone until his death in 1521.

References

External links and additional sources
 (for Chronology of Bishops) 
 (for Chronology of Bishops) 

16th-century Italian Roman Catholic bishops
1521 deaths
People from Crotone
Bishops appointed by Pope Julius II